Herefordshire is a county in the West Midlands of England, governed by Herefordshire Council. It is bordered by Shropshire to the north, Worcestershire to the east, Gloucestershire to the south-east, and the Welsh counties of Monmouthshire and Powys to the west. 

Hereford, the county town of Herefordshire has a population of approximately 61,000, making it the largest settlement in the county. The next biggest town is Leominster and then Ross-on-Wye. The county, situated in the historic Welsh Marches, is one of the most rural and sparsely populated counties in England, with a population density of 82/km2 (212/sq mi), and a 2021 population of 187,100 – the fourth-smallest of any ceremonial county in England. The land use is mostly agricultural and the county is well known for its fruit and cider production, and for the Hereford cattle breed.

Constitution
From 1974 to 1998, Herefordshire was part of the former non-metropolitan county of Hereford and Worcester.

Herefordshire was reconstituted both as a new district as "County of Herefordshire" (effective 19 July 1996) and as a new county (coextensive with the area of the aforementioned district) (effective 1 April 1998) by Statutory Instrument as defined in The Hereford and Worcester (Structural, Boundary and Electoral Changes) Order 1996. This Order established Herefordshire as a unitary authority on 1 April 1998, combining county and district functions into a single council. Herefordshire is also commonly called a unitary district, but this is not official nomenclature. Herefordshire is officially known as a unitary authority for local government purposes. It is governed by Herefordshire Council which was created in 1998 with the new unitary district that absorbed the previous administrative areas of Hereford City Council, South Herefordshire District Council, most of Leominster District Council, and part of Malvern Hills District Council, all within the previous non-metropolitan county of Hereford and Worcester, whose functions the new authority inherited within its area. The remainder of Malvern Hills district absorbed the Worcestershire part of Leominster district (the area around Tenbury Wells) and continued to constitute a (smaller) district within the new two-tier county of Worcestershire.

The Lieutenancies Act 1997 made Herefordshire a ceremonial county, covering the exact area of the unitary district. For Eurostat purposes it is a NUTS 3 region (code UKG11) and is one of three counties that comprise the "Herefordshire, Worcestershire and Warwickshire" NUTS 2 region.

Physical geography

It flows through both Hereford and Ross-on-Wye before returning to Wales. Leominster is situated on the River Lugg, a tributary of the Wye.

There are two Areas of Outstanding Natural Beauty in the county. The Wye Valley is located in the river's valleys south of Hereford, while the Malvern Hills are in the east of the county, along its border with Worcestershire.

History

Herefordshire is one of the 39 historic counties of England. Herefordshire County Council was created in 1889. 

In 1974, the administrative county formed in 1889 was merged with that of neighbouring Worcestershire to form Hereford and Worcester. Within this, Herefordshire was covered by the local government districts of South Herefordshire, Hereford, and part of Malvern Hills and Leominster districts. However, the county was dissolved in 1998, resulting in the return of Herefordshire and Worcestershire as counties.

The current ceremonial county and unitary district have broadly the same borders as the historic county.

Demographics

Population growth

Herefordshire's growth rate has, in recent decades, been higher than the national average, with the population increasing by 
14.4% between 1991 and 2011; the population of England as a whole increased by only 10.0%. However, this has been from a lower base, with only Northumberland and Cumbria having lower population densities than Herefordshire.

In the late 19th and early 20th century the population of the county declined steadily.

Travellers
Gypsies and Travellers have historically been Herefordshire's largest minority ethnic group. They are made up of three main groups:
 Romanichal or Romany "Gypsies"
 Irish Travellers
New Travellers or New Age Travellers

Romany Gypsies and Irish Travellers fall within the definition of a minority ethnic group under the Race Relations Amendment Act (2000). They have contributed to the development of the county, for example through seasonal working in orchards. There were approximately 400 people (0.2%) within this minority group in the county at the 2011 Census.

Cities, towns and villages
 

The major settlements in the county include Hereford, which is the county town and Herefordshire's only city, as well as the towns of Leominster, Ledbury, Ross-on-Wye, Kington and Bromyard.

Economy
This is a chart of trend of regional gross value added of Herefordshire at current basic prices published by the Office for National Statistics with figures in millions of British Pounds Sterling.

 includes hunting and forestry

 includes energy and construction

 includes financial intermediation services indirectly measured

 Components may not sum to totals due to rounding

Many well-known cider producers are based in Herefordshire. These include Weston's cider of Much Marcle, and Bulmer's cider, from Hereford, which produces the UK market leader Strongbow.

Employment
Most employment in Herefordshire is in agriculture, manufacturing and services. According to Herefordshire Council's online document "worklessness", 10% of people are unemployed in Herefordshire including out-of-work, homeless, ill and disabled and their carers. Cargill Meats and H. P. Bulmers are two of the largest private sector employers, with the Council and NHS being the largest public sector employers.

Politics

Westminster Parliamentary

There are two parliamentary constituencies in Herefordshire. , Bill Wiggin represents North Herefordshire and Jesse Norman represents Hereford and South Herefordshire. Both politicians are members of the Conservative Party.

Council

The council operates a cabinet-style council and has been independently controlled since 2019. The chairman is Councillor Sebastian Bowen and the leader of the council is Councillor David Hitchiner.

The Cabinet Leader is appointed yearly by the full council of 53 councillors. The Cabinet Leader then picks their deputy and up to 8 other councillors to form the executive cabinet. Each cabinet member makes the decisions about the portfolio that they are allocated. Elections to the council are held every 4 years. Elections are conducted under the FPTP system with the 53 wards returning 1 councillor each. Elections have been held in 2000, 2003, 2007, 2011, 2015 and 2019, with the next election due in 2023.

In the 2019 election, the Conservatives lost control of Herefordshire Council.

Education

Herefordshire has a comprehensive education system that also includes several independent schools. Most state secondary schools are for ages 11–16. Colleges of further and higher education in the county include Hereford College of Arts, Hereford College of Education, Hereford Sixth Form College, Herefordshire and Ludlow College and the Royal National College for the Blind.

Agriculture
The agricultural economy has changed greatly in recent years within the county. The county is on the western edge of England which has been historically pastoral as opposed to the east which was more arable.

Beef

 
Probably Hereford's most famous export is its Hereford beef cattle. Herefords are docile but extremely hardy creatures and these attributes have led to their proliferation across the world, particularly the US, Canada, South America and Australia. The breed is so gentle that a Hereford bull was used as the mascot for Hereford United Football Club for many years, led around the club's Edgar Street ground before major matches.

Fruit
The county is famous for its apple and pear orchards, and its cider. There are many orchards around the county but not as many as there once were.

In the last few years, soft fruits such as strawberries have become a new and rapidly expanding area of the agricultural economy of the county. One of the main reasons for this was the introduction of the polytunnel or French tunnel. This allows the strawberries to be grown for a far longer season and with a higher quality (with no blemishes from the rain). The strawberries are mainly picked by Eastern European workers who come over for the season and often earn more money, more than they could working in their own country and with the bonus, for many of them, of learning or improving their English. The polytunnels have been a major issue in the county, as some people see them as a "blot on the landscape".

Although some polytunnel sites are illegal, Herefordshire Council has turned a blind eye in the belief that agriculture must be allowed to innovate; otherwise it will stagnate and the county will suffer.

Dairy
Previously, most farms in the county had dairy cattle. Due to the cost of investing in new equipment, long hours, BSE, foot-and-mouth disease and mainly falling milk prices, the county's milk production has drastically reduced, with only a few farms still in dairy farming.

Potatoes
The county is historically pastoral. The soils are mostly clay, meaning that large scale potato production was very difficult, as tractors were not powerful enough to pull the large machinery required to harvest the crop. Around the early 1990s new technology and more powerful machines overcame this problem. Potato production started to increase, fuelled by a few other key factors: The previously pastoral soils had not had potatoes grown in them; consequently they were not infected with eelworm (Heterodera rostochiensis and Heterodera pallida), which in the east of England had to be sprayed against weekly (a large cost). Also, the clay soil produced an unblemished potato of the highest grade. The intensive nature of the crop meant that potatoes could be grown viably on a given field in only one of every five years. Because potato growers always needed more land than they owned, they rented extra. This demand for rental fields came at a time when the rest of the industry was struggling and in serious decline. The potato farmers' rents of £300–500 per acre (as opposed to normally £80 per acre) were very helpful to many farmers in a difficult period.

Emblems

Coat of arms
Herefordshire County Council was granted a coat of arms on 28 February 1946. The arms became obsolete in 1974 on the abolition of the council, but were transferred to the present Herefordshire Council by Order in Council in 1997.

The arms are blazoned as follows:

Gules on a fesse wavy between in chief a lion passant guardant argent and in base a Herefordshire bull's head caboshed proper, a bar wavy azure; and for a Crest on a wreath of the colours a demi lion rampant gules holding in the sinister claw a fleece or; and for Supporters, on the dexter side a lion guardant or gorged with a wreath of hops fructed proper and on the sinister a talbot argent gorged with a collar or charged with three apples proper.

The red colouring ("gules") of the shield is taken from the arms of the City of Hereford. The red colour also represents the red earth of Herefordshire. The silver and blue wave across the centre of the shield represents the River Wye. The lions that form parts of the arms, crest and supporters are also taken from Hereford's arms. The agricultural produce of Herefordshire is represented by the bull's head, fleece, hops and apples. The talbot dog comes from the heraldry of the Talbot family, Marcher Lords of Shrewsbury and also from that of Viscount Hereford.

The Latin motto is: Pulchra terra Dei donum ("This fair land is the gift of God").

County flower
As part of a competition organised by the charity Plantlife to raise awareness of conservation issues, the public were asked to vote for "county flowers" that they felt best represented their county. Mistletoe was announced as the winning choice for Herefordshire in 2004. The emblem has no official status and has not been widely adopted. Herefordshire Council uses a logo consisting of a green apple.

Sport

Perhaps the most famous sporting team in Herefordshire is Hereford United football club, who were members of the Football League and played at Edgar Street stadium in the city of Hereford. The club was founded in 1924 on the merger of two local teams – St Martin's and RAOC – and became members of the Birmingham Combination League. The club then made its way upwards to the Southern Football League, finally gaining election to the Football League in 1972 – the same year that the club famously defeated First Division side Newcastle United in an FA Cup tie. Two successive promotions saw the club reach the Second Division in 1978, but two successive relegations followed and saw the club side back into the Fourth Division. Despite being situated within England, the club has competed in the Welsh Cup on a number of occasions, winning the trophy in 1990. The club suffered relegation from the Football League in 1997 and fell into the Football Conference, not regaining its Football League status until 2006. The club then played in Football League Two – the fourth tier of English football – for six years before once again being relegated out of the Football League at the end of the 2011–12 season. The club was wound up in 2014. A new phoenix club, Hereford F.C. was set up competing in the Midland Football League Premier Division (9th tier) for its first season, 2015–16. The club lost to Morpeth Town at Wembley Stadium on 22 May 2016 in the final of the FA Vase.

Cricket is widely played within the county, and Herefordshire County Cricket Club compete in the Minor Counties Championship, having been elected in 1992 to take Durham's place, when that county joined the First-class structure. The leading club sides in Herefordshire are Brockhampton CC and Eastnor CC, who both compete in the Birmingham and District Premier League, the ECB accredited Premier League for cricket clubs in the West Midlands, and one of the strongest cricket leagues in England. Below that in the cricketing pyramid system 7 other leading Herefordshire clubs compete in the Worcestershire County Cricket League, with the remaining 25 or so cricket clubs within the county competing in the Marches League, or just playing Sunday or mid-week 'friendly' matches.

Places of interest

 Abbey Dore Court 
 Arthur's Stone 
 Berrington Hall  
 Brockhampton Estate  
 Courtyard Centre for the Arts – Hereford's main theatre and art performance centre
 Croft Castle 
 Dore Abbey 
 Eastnor Castle 
 Edgar Street (Football Stadium Home to Hereford F.C.)
 Eye Manor 
 Goodrich Castle 
 Hampton Court 
 Hellens Manor 
 Hereford Cathedral 
 Kilpeck Church 
 Malvern Hills 
 Herefordshire Beacon
 Priory Church, Leominster 
 Sutton Walls Hill Fort
 Wigmore Castle 
 Welsh Newton

Transport

Road

The M50, one of the first motorways to be built in the United Kingdom, runs through the south of the county and, with the A40 dual carriageway, forms part of the major route linking South Wales with the West Midlands and the north of England. The A49 runs north–south through the county and is a strategic route between North and South Wales as well as catering for local traffic.

Railways
The Welsh Marches Line also runs north–south with passenger trains operated by Transport for Wales offering links to Manchester as well as to North and South Wales. Hereford is the western end of the Cotswold Line which runs via Worcester with through services to Oxford and London Paddington (operated by Great Western Railway) and to Birmingham (operated by West Midlands Trains). The rural Heart of Wales Line linking Craven Arms in Shropshire to Llanelli in southwest Wales passes through the extreme north west of Herefordshire with stations at Knighton and Bucknell near the meeting point of the boundaries of Herefordshire, Shropshire and Powys. The majority of passengers between North and South Wales use the Marches line.

Former lines which are now closed were the Ledbury and Gloucester Railway; Ross & Monmouth Railway; Hereford to Hay-on-Wye; Pontrilas to Hay-on-Wye; Hay-on-Wye to Brecon; Leominster to New Radnor; Eardisley to Presteigne; and Leominster to Worcester via Bromyard. Part of the Titley Spur is opened annually by enthusiasts and a steam train is run along the track.

There has long been talk of a new station at Rotherwas, in the south of Hereford.

Air
There are no airports with Scheduled air transport in Herefordshire. Birmingham Airport, Cardiff Airport and Bristol Airport are the nearest. The RailAir RailAir coach operated by First Berkshire & The Thames Valley provides connections to Heathrow Airport via Reading station or passengers can change at Reading station and then go all the way by train via Hayes & Harlington to Heathrow Airport. Shobdon Aerodrome near Leominster is a centre for general aviation and gliding. Hot air ballooning is also popular with Eastnor Castle being one of the favourite launch sites in the area.

Waterways
Historically, the rivers Wye, Teme and Lugg were navigable but the wide seasonal variations in water levels mean that few craft larger than canoes and coracles are now used. There are canoe centres at The Boat House, Glasbury-on-Wye (in Powys, Wales), the Hereford Youth Service and Kerne Bridge in Ross-on-Wye, as well as rowing clubs in Hereford and Ross-on-Wye.

The early 19th century saw the construction of two canals, The Herefordshire & Gloucestershire Canal and The Leominster & Stourport Canal but these were never successful and there are now few remains to be seen. The Herefordshire & Gloucestershire Canal is currently the subject a restoration project, which includes the construction of a new canal basin in Hereford city centre as part of the regeneration of the Edgar Street Grid. The project, however, is being undertaken by a small voluntary group and there is no expected date for any part of the canal to re-open for boating.

Notable people

 Jarrod Bowen, footballer
 Simon Carr, cyclist
 Frank Oz, Actor and voice actor, producer, director 
 Matthew Hall, writer
 Dennis Potter, writer
 Elizabeth Barrett Browning, poet
 Richard Hammond, Top Gear and The Grand Tour presenter 
 Mary Duggan, cricketer
 Noele Gordon, actress
 Mike Oldfield, musician
 Mick Ralphs, Mott the Hoople and Bad Company guitarist
 Richard Ashcroft, songwriter and lead singer of The Verve
 Thomas Britten, 19th-century footballer
 Monty Don, BBC TV presenter
 Robert Devereux, 2nd Earl of Essex, favourite of Queen Elizabeth I
 Conroy Maddox, artist
 Beryl Reid, actress
 Jessica Raine, actress
 Sir Edward Elgar, composer
 Sir Roy Strong, art historian 
 David Garrick, renowned actor of the 18th century
 Lady Godiva, wife of Leofric, Earl of Mercia
 Harold Godwinson, Earl of Hereford and last Anglo-Saxon King of England
 Ellie Goulding, musician
 Nell Gwynne, mistress of King Charles II of England
 Terry Jenkins, professional darts player
 St. John Kemble (martyr) Catholic priest
 Francis Kilvert, 19th century diarist and Church of England clergyman
 Mark Labbett, one of five Chasers on The Chase as well as its Australian counterpart
 Albert Lee, guitarist
 Peter Mandelson, politician and former resident of Foy
 John Masefield, poet laureate
 Sidney Nolan, Australian artist 
 John Oldcastle, Lollard leader and basis for Shakespeare's character Falstaff
 Blanche Parry, lady-in-waiting to Queen Elizabeth I
 Peter Scudamore, jockey
 James Honeyman-Scott, guitarist The Pretenders
 Pete Farndon, bass guitarist The Pretenders
 Martin Chambers, drummer The Pretenders
 Tom Spring, bare-knuckle boxer, champion of England in the 19th century
 Thomas Traherne, 17th century poet
 Alfred Watkins, pioneering archaeologist and photographer
 Richard Johnson, jockey
 Sir Walter Roper Lawrence, author
 Allan Leonard Lewis Posthumously awarded the Victoria Cross, Died 21 September 1918, commemorated on Vis-En-Artois Memorial, France
 Richard Hakluyt Elizabethan writer and geographer who recorded contemporary voyages of exploration and promoted the settlement of North America
 Ronald Pennell, artist, engraver and sculptor
 Geoffrey Wood, botanist

See also
 Custos Rotulorum of Herefordshire – Keeper of the Rolls
 Herefordshire (UK Parliament constituency) – Historical list of MPs for Herefordshire constituency
 List of High Sheriffs of Herefordshire
 List of schools in Herefordshire
 List of Lord Lieutenants of Herefordshire

References

External links

Herefordshire Council
Visit Herefordshire
Full Guide To Herefordshire
Things To Do In Herefordshire
Where To Eat In Herefordshire
Events & What's On In Herefordshire

Ceremonial counties of England
Local government districts of the West Midlands (region)
NUTS 3 statistical regions of the United Kingdom
Unitary authority districts of England
West Midlands (region)
Counties of England established in antiquity
Counties of England disestablished in 1974
Counties of England established in 1998